A Virginia Byway is a scenic road designated by the Commonwealth of Virginia as one that can introduce tourists to alternative destinations.

The sign design, which features a cardinal, Virginia's state bird, was adopted in January 1975.

List of Virginia Byways

See also

References

Byway